Joseph Duncan was an American Negro league catcher in the 1920s.

Duncan played for the Bacharach Giants in 1927. In 16 recorded games, he posted eight hits in 40 plate appearances.

References

External links
 and Seamheads

Year of birth missing
Year of death missing
Place of birth missing
Place of death missing
Bacharach Giants players
Date of birth missing
Date of death missing
Baseball catchers